None of the Above is the 26th studio album by Peter Hammill, released on his Fie! label in 2000.

Production and instrumentation 
Hammill recorded None of the Above in his home studio, Terra Incognita, between January 1999 and February 2000, playing, producing and arranging nearly all instruments and singing nearly all voices. Some contributions were made by Stuart Gordon (violin, viola) on three tracks and Manny Elias (drums, percussion) on one track. Peter Hammill's daughters Holly and Beatrice Hammill sing backing soprano voices on two tracks. The instrumentation is dominated by guitars (more as a "colour-wash", as Hammill wrote in his newsletter), keyboards and some strings.

The long recording time is due to Hammill's parallel work on a remastered 4-CD compilation of Van der Graaf Generator called The Box.

Title 
The title of the album is the English phrase "None of the above", meaning none of the other choices are appropriate. The expression can be seen here as a metaphor for "people in earthy and/or earthly circumstances", i.e. as the opposite to heavenly conditions.

Mood and style 
The mood of the album is calm and melancholic. A typical song is "Naming the Rose", a chamber music-like arrangement for lead vocals, keyboards (in Hammond organ sound), violas and background choirs. It is about a gardener who names his last creation – a damask rose – after his wife who died on the very day the best blossom opened. The rose breeder fertilizes the seeds of the variety with the ashes of his wife. Thus the couple that had no children both live on in the new rose.

The first seven tracks all have the same topic as "Naming the Rose": people coming to an end of a phase in their life, in very different circumstances. But the eighth song ("Astart") says: every end can be a new start. In his newsletter from April 2000, Hammill comments:

Cover 
The cover shows a serious-looking Hammill photographed by Dinu and the back cover – again alluding to the title of the album – a section of the star-spangled sky.

The booklet was designed by Paul Ridout. Each double page shows a washed-out photo presenting a staircase or a ladder ending nowhere or against a bricked entrance or upon an empty floor with black garbage bags lying around. Only the last double page for the song "Astart" shows busy people on an elevator rolling into some kind of shop scene.

Reception 

The music press did not take much notice of None of the Above. In allmusic.com Simon Cantlon gave 3 out of 5 stars for "poignant musical snapshots" and "atmosphere" but found "points on this release when things become a bit too monotonous". With 3 out of 5 stars the same rating is given on the fan site Progarchives.

Track listing 
All songs written by Peter Hammill.
 "Touch and Go" – 4:05
 "Naming the Rose" – 5:16
 "How Far I Fell" – 5:55
 "Somebody Bad Enough" – 4:03
 "Tango for One" – 6:43
 "Like Veronica" – 5:54
 "In a Bottle" – 8:01
 "Astart" – 4:17

Personnel 
All tracks are played and sung by Peter Hammill with the following contributions:
 Stuart Gordon – violin, viola (2, 5, 8)
 Manny Elias – drums, percussion (6)
 Holly Hammill – vocals (2, 8)
 Beatrice Hammill – vocals (2, 8)

Technical
Peter Hammill - recording engineer, mixing (Terra Incognita, Bath)
Paul Ridout - design

Notes

External links 
 Peter Hammill's comments on the album

Peter Hammill albums
2000 albums